WGCM-FM (102.3 FM, "Coast 102"), is a classic hits formatted radio station based in Gulfport–Biloxi, Mississippi. The station is owned by Coast Radio Group Inc.

Signal
WGCM-FM's 384-foot tower with a 50,000 watt signal can reach east to Pascagoula, Mississippi, west to Slidell, Louisiana, and north to Wiggins, Mississippi. The transmitter tower is located on the Pass Christian and Long Beach, Mississippi, city limits line.

History
WGCM-FM started September 14, 1969. WGCM-FM had a country format in the early-to-mid-1980s. After the country format, WGCM-FM  became a rock station using the moniker "TK 102".  In 1989, WGCM-FM became "Coast 102", playing 1950s-1970s' oldies, and eventually "Greatest Hits of All Time" (1960s-1980s pop), its current format.

External links
Coast 102 WGCM-FM official website

GCM
Classic hits radio stations in the United States